is a Japanese photographer.

References

Japanese photographers
1964 births
Living people
Street photographers
Place of birth missing (living people)
Tokyo College of Photography alumni